Gordon A. Weaver (February 2, 1937 – April 2, 2021) was an American novelist and short story writer.

Life and career
Weaver was born in Moline, Illinois in February 1937, the fifth of the five children of Noble Rodell Weaver and Inez Katherine Nelson. His family moved to Milwaukee, Wisconsin in 1941.  He graduated from Wauwatosa High School in 1955.  After three years service in the United States Army (1955–1958), he graduated from the University of Wisconsin–Milwaukee in 1961, from the University of Illinois with an MA in 1962, and from the University of Denver with a Ph.D. in 1970.  He taught at Siena College  1963-1965, Marietta College 1965-1968, University of Southern Mississippi 1970–1975, Oklahoma State University 1975–1995, Vermont College 1983-1989, and University of Wisconsin–Milwaukee 1996–2000.

He was founding editor of the Mississippi Review, fiction editor of Cimarron Review from 1975 to 1986, managing editor of the AWP (Association of Writers & Writing Programs) Award Series for Short Fiction from 1977 to 1979, and general editor of the Twayne Studies in Short Fiction (Twayne Publishers, Boston/New York) from 1986 to 1997.

More than a hundred of his stories have appeared in a wide variety of literary magazines, including Agni, Antioch Review, Carolina Quarterly, Confrontation, Georgia Review, Iowa Review, The Literary Review, New Letters, Ploughshares, and Southwest Review.  His novel Count a Lonely Cadence, was adapted for the movie Cadence, starring Charlie Sheen.

Weaver was the father of three daughters. He retired to the Milwaukee area in the 1990s and died in April 2021.

His papers are held at Boston University.

Awards
 St. Lawrence Award for Fiction (1973)
 Quarterly West Fiction Prize (1978)
 O. Henry First Prize (1978)
 Pushcart Prize in 1985 and 1997
 The Best American Short Stories 1980 for "Hog's Heart"
 National Endowment of the Arts fellowships in 1974 and 1989
 1979 O. Henry Award
  Sherwood Anderson Award (1982)
  Quarterly West Novella Prize (1984)
 2002 James C. McCormick Fellowship in Fiction (Christopher Isherwood Foundation).
  Andrew Lytle Fiction Prize (2007)

Works

Novels

Short Stories

Poetry

Non-fiction

Adaptations
  The movie Cadence was based on Weaver's novel Count a Lonely Cadence.

References

External links
"Interview", Pif magazine
"Feeding the Bulldog", Web Del Sol

1937 births
2021 deaths
20th-century American male writers
20th-century American novelists
20th-century American short story writers
American male novelists
American male short story writers
Novelists from Mississippi
Novelists from Oklahoma
Novelists from Wisconsin
O. Henry Award winners
Oklahoma State University faculty
University of Denver alumni
University of Illinois alumni
University of Southern Mississippi faculty
University of Wisconsin–Milwaukee alumni
University of Wisconsin–Milwaukee faculty
People from Moline, Illinois